Solomon Grimes (born 24 July 1987) is a  Liberian former professional footballer who last played for Nea Salamina in the Cypriot First Division in Cyprus.

Early career
Grimes started his career with Liberian league side Mighty Barroe in 2003, where he spent six years with the club before moving on to Liberian top side LISCR FC in 2007. With Grimes proving to be a top player, it wasn't long before he would join Greek side Ethnikos Piraeus for the remainder of the 2007 season. Grimes was later loaned out for the 2008 season to another Greek side Kalamata where he made 18 appearances. He later rejoined Ethnikos Piraeus till the 2011 season making 92 appearances. In 2011, Grimes joined Cypriot Club Nea Salamina where he  played from  2011-2016.

International career
Grimes gained his first call up against Gambia at the age of 17 in the 2004–2005 World Cup Qualification Round  with the Liberia National Football Team and have gone on to make 38 appearances for the Nation and is one of the most experience players on the national team.

References

External links
 
 

1987 births
Living people
Sportspeople from Monrovia
Association football midfielders
Liberian footballers
Ethnikos Piraeus F.C. players
Kalamata F.C. players
Asteras Tripolis F.C. players
Nea Salamis Famagusta FC players
Expatriate footballers in Greece
Expatriate footballers in Cyprus
Liberia international footballers
Mighty Barrolle players
Football League (Greece) players
Cypriot First Division players
LISCR FC players